The Marshall is a  mountain summit located in Mount Assiniboine Provincial Park, in the Canadian Rockies of British Columbia, Canada. Its nearest higher peak is Mount Assiniboine,  to the east-southeast. The mountain is situated west of Wedgwood Peak.

History

The mountain was named in 1913 by the Interprovincial Boundary Survey due to its "leading" position. It was alternately known as Centurion Peak since "centurion" was a Roman commanding officer, synonymous with "Field marshal", a commander of military forces.

The first ascent of The Marshall was made in 1919 by Val Fynn with Rudolph Aemmer as guide.

The mountain's name was officially adopted March 31, 1924, by the Geographical Names Board of Canada.

Geology
The Marshall is composed of sedimentary rock laid down during the Cambrian period. Formed in shallow seas, this sedimentary rock was pushed east and over the top of younger rock during the Laramide orogeny.

Climate
Based on the Köppen climate classification, The Marshall is located in a subarctic climate zone with cold, snowy winters, and mild summers. Temperatures can drop below −20 °C with wind chill factors below −30 °C. Precipitation runoff from The Marshall drains into tributaries of the Mitchell River.

See also
 
 Geography of British Columbia
 Geology of British Columbia

References

External links
 Mount Assiniboine Provincial Park
 Flickr photo

The Marshall
The Marshall
Kootenay Land District